Camitia is a genus of sea snails, marine gastropod mollusks in the family Trochidae, the top snails.

Description
The orbicular shell is, depressed, smooth, and polished. The axis is  imperforate. The columella is spirally twisted above, forming a false-umbilicus, with a simple margin. The columella has an edentulate edge and ends in a point.

Distribution
The species in this marine genus occur off China and Japan.

Species
Species within the genus Camitia include:
 Camitia pulcherrima Gray, J.E., 1842
 Camitia rotellina (Gould, 1849)
 † Camitia (Micatia) plicata N.F. Sohl, 1998  (from the Maastrichtian of Jamaica)

References

 Higo, S., Callomon, P. & Goto, Y. (1999) Catalogue and Bibliography of the Marine Shell-Bearing Mollusca of Japan. Elle Scientific Publications, Yao, Japan, 749 pp.

External links

 
Trochidae
Gastropod genera